Christian Rub (pronounced Rhoob; April 13, 1886 – April 14, 1956) was an Austrian-born American character actor. He was known for his work in films of the late 1910s to the early 1950s, and was featured in more than 100 films.

Biography

He was born in Graz, in Austria-Hungary. His first appearance was in the 1919 movie The Belle of New York. Rub was the visual basis for and voice of Geppetto in the 1940 animated Disney film Pinocchio, as well as voices of kindly old men for MGM, Fox and Warner Bros. cartoons.  During the creation of Pinocchio, Rub was notorious amongst the film's animators for his open and frequent expression of admiration for Adolf Hitler.

Rub's last movie role was in 1952's Something for the Birds. He died in Santa Barbara, California one day after his 70th birthday.

Partial filmography 

 The Belle of New York (1919) – (film debut)
 The Trial of Vivienne Ware (1932) – Axel Nordstrom
 The Man from Yesterday (1932) – Swiss Terrace Waiter
 Those We Love (1932) – (uncredited)
 The Crooked Circle (1932) – Old Dan
 Le bluffeur (1932) – Dr. Rudolph Pfeiffer – Inventor
 Silver Dollar (1932) – Rische
 Secrets of the French Police (1932) – Anton Dorain
 No Other Woman (1933) – Eli Bogavitch
 The Billion Dollar Scandal (1933) – Locksmith Convict (uncredited)
 Luxury Liner (1933) – Peasant Father
 Humanity (1933) – Schmiddy
 The Mind Reader (1933) – Printer (uncredited)
 The Kiss Before the Mirror (1933) – Man on the Wrong Floor
 Mary Stevens, M.D. (1933) – Gus – Mary's Janitor
 Tugboat Annie (1933) – Sailor (uncredited)
 Bureau of Missing Persons (1933) – Apartment House Custodian (uncredited)
 A Man of Sentiment (1933) – Herman Heupelkossel
 Man of Two Worlds (1934) – Knudson
 The Cat and the Fiddle (1934) – Innkeeper (uncredited)
 No More Women (1934) – Big Pants
 No Greater Glory (1934) – Watchman
 Private Scandal (1934) – August – First Customer (uncredited)
 Little Man, What Now? (1934) – Herr Puttbreese
 Stamboul Quest (1934) – Dr. Joachim Leder (uncredited)
 Romance in the Rain (1934) – Slotnick
 The Fountain (1934) – Kerstholt
 No Ransom (1934) – Budge (uncredited)
 I Am a Thief (1934) – Train Station Attendant (uncredited)
 Music in the Air (1934) – Zipfelhuber
 The Mighty Barnum (1934) – Bit Part (uncredited)
 The Night Is Young (1935) – Cafe Proprietor (uncredited)
 Romance in Manhattan (1935) – Otto – an Immigrant (uncredited)
 Maybe It's Love (1935) – Ole – the Janitor (uncredited)
 One More Spring (1935) – Man with glasses in elevator (uncredited)
 A Dog of Flanders (1935) – Hans
 Black Fury (1935) – Hospitalized Miner (uncredited)
 Stolen Harmony (1935) – Mathew Huxley (uncredited)
 Mark of the Vampire (1935) – Deaf Man at Inquest (uncredited)
 Age of Indiscretion (1935) – Briggs (uncredited)
 Let 'Em Have It (1935) – Henkel
 Oil for the Lamps of China (1935) – Dr. Jorgen
 Ladies Crave Excitement (1935) – Lars Swenson
 Metropolitan (1935) – Weidel
 Peter Ibbetson (1935) – Maj. Duquesnois
 The Man Who Broke the Bank at Monte Carlo (1935) – Gallard's Guide (uncredited)
 We're Only Human (1935) – William Anderson
 Hitch Hike Lady (1935) – Farmer
 Tough Guy (1936) – Cap (uncredited)
 Next Time We Love (1936) – Otto—Innkeeper (uncredited)
 The Leathernecks Have Landed (1936) – Schooner Captain
 Till We Meet Again (1936) – Old Conductor (uncredited)
 Mr. Deeds Goes to Town (1936) – Christian Jenson (uncredited)
 Murder on a Bridle Path (1936) – Chris Thomas
 Dracula's Daughter (1936) – Coachman (uncredited)
 The Princess Comes Across (1936) – Gustavson (uncredited)
 Fury (1936) – Sven Ahern – Barber (uncredited)
 Parole! (1936) – John – Jury Foreman (uncredited)
 Sins of Man (1936) – Fritz
 Suzy (1936) – 'Pop' Gaspard
 Girls' Dormitory (1936) – Forester
 Star for a Night (1936) – Postmaster (uncredited)
 The Devil Is a Sissy (1936) – Tombstone Mason (uncredited)
 Murder with Pictures (1936) – Olaf (uncredited)
 Love on the Run (1936) – Stephen (uncredited)
 Outcast (1937) – Olaf – the Valet
 Maytime (1937) – Sleeper Outside Cafe (uncredited)
 When Love Is Young (1937) – Anton Werner
 Thin Ice (1937) – Minister (scenes deleted)
 Café Metropole (1937) – Maxl Schinner
 Captains Courageous (1937) – Old Clement (uncredited)
 It Could Happen to You (1937) – Clavish
 One Hundred Men and a Girl (1937) – Brandstetter
 Heidi (1937) – Baker
 Prescription for Romance (1937) – Conductor
 Tovarich (1937) – Trombone Player (uncredited)
 Mad About Music (1938) – Pierre
 Professor Beware (1938) – Gustave – Museum Attendant (uncredited)
 I'll Give a Million (1938) – Commissionaire
 You Can't Take It with You (1938) – Mr. Schmidt
 The Great Waltz (1938) – Coachman
 Never Say Die (1939) – The Mayor
 Forged Passport (1939) – Mr. Nelson
 Hidden Power (1939) – Doctor
 No Place to Go (1939) – Otto Schlemmer
 Everything Happens at Night (1939) – Telegrapher
 Pinocchio (1940) – Geppetto (voice, uncredited)
 Swiss Family Robinson (1940) – Thoren
 Ski Patrol (1940) – Jakob Sorenson, old villager
 Earthbound (1940) – Etienne Almette
 Four Sons (1940) – Kapek
 All This, and Heaven Too (1940) – Loti (uncredited)
 Haunted House (1940) – Olaf Jensen
 Rhythm on the River (1940) – Pawnbroker (uncredited)
 Father's Son (1941) – Lunk Nelson
 Henry Aldrich for President (1941) – Janitor (uncredited)
 Dangerously They Live (1941) – Steiner
 Nazi Agent (1942) – Mohr (uncredited)
 It Happened in Flatbush (1942) – Pop Schlumbom (uncredited)
 Tales of Manhattan (1942) – Cello Player (Laughton sequence)
 Berlin Correspondent (1942) – Prisoner
 Chetniks! The Fighting Guerrillas (1943) – Tailor (uncredited)
 The Leather Burners (1943) – Sooky Withers (uncredited)
 Bomber's Moon (1943) – Johann
 Princess O'Rourke (1943) – Janitor (uncredited)
 The Adventures of Mark Twain (1944) – Jones (uncredited)
 Once Upon a Time (1944) – Mr. Snapps – Janitor (uncredited)
 Jungle Woman (1944) – George – Groundsman
 Three Is a Family (1944) – Bellboy
 Rhapsody in Blue (1945) – Swedish Janitor (uncredited)
 Strange Confession (1945) – Mr. Moore
 Fall Guy (1947) – Swede
 Something for the Birds (1952) – Leo Fischer (final film role)

References

External links 
 
 
 

1886 births
1956 deaths
American male film actors
American male voice actors
Austro-Hungarian emigrants to the United States
People from Passau